Mercury commonly refers to:
 Mercury (planet), the nearest planet to the Sun
 Mercury (element), a metallic chemical element with the symbol Hg
 Mercury (mythology), a Roman god

Mercury or The Mercury may also refer to:

Companies 
 Mercury (toy manufacturer), a brand of diecast toy cars manufactured in Italy
 Mercury Communications, a British telecommunications firm set up in the 1980s
 Mercury Drug, a Philippine pharmacy chain
 Mercury Energy, an electricity generation and retail company in New Zealand
 Mercury Filmworks, a Canadian independent animation studio
 Mercury General, a multiple-line American insurance organization
 Mercury Interactive, a software testing tools vendor
 Mercury Marine, a manufacturer of marine engines, particularly outboard motors
 Mercury Systems, a defense-related information technology company

Computing 
 Mercury (programming language), a functional logic programming language
 Mercury (metadata search system), a data search system for earth science research 
 Ferranti Mercury, an early 1950s commercial computer
 Mercury Browser, a freeware mobile browser
 Mercury Mail Transport System, an email server

Film and television
Mercury (film), a 2018 Indian silent horror thriller by Karthik Subbaraj
Mercury (TV series), an Australian television series
Mercury, a fictional town in Young Adult
 Mercury Black, a character in the RWBY web series
 Sailor Mercury, a character in the Sailor Moon manga and anime franchise

Literature

Comics
 Mercury (Marvel Comics), a character who can turn herself into a mercurial substance
 Makkari (comics) or Mercury, an Eternal, a Marvel Comics race of superhumans
 Mercury, a member of the Metal Men, a DC Comics team
 Mercury, a member of Cerebro's X-Men
 Mercury, an Amalgam Comics character

Magazines
 Mercury (magazine), an astronomy magazine
 The American Mercury, originally a literary magazine, gradually more political

Newspapers

 The Mercury (Hobart), Tasmania, Australia
 The Mercury (South Africa), Durban
 The Mercury (Pennsylvania), US
 Mercury (Newport), Rhode Island, US
 The Mercury, former name of the Reading Mercury
 List of newspapers named Mercury, for newspapers whose titles include that word

Novels
 Mercury (Bova novel), a novel by Ben Bova
 Mercury (Livesey novel), a novel by Margot Livesey
 Mercury, a novel by Anna Kavan

Music
 Mercury Nashville, a record label
 Mercury Records, a record label
 Mercury Prize, an annual music prize awarded for the best album from the United Kingdom
 "Mercury, the Winged Messenger", a movement in Gustav Holst's The Planets

Albums
 Mercury (American Music Club album) (1993)
 Mercury (Longview album) (2003)
 Mercury (Madder Mortem album) (1999)
 Mercury – Act 1 (2021), by Imagine Dragons
 Mercury – Acts 1 & 2 (2022), by Imagine Dragons

Songs
 "Mercury" (song), a 2008 song by Bloc Party
 "Mercury", a song by Counting Crows from Recovering the Satellites
 "Mercury", a song by Kathleen Edwards from Failer
 "Mercury", a song by Sufjan Stevens, Bryce Dessner, Nico Muhly and James McAlister from Planetarium

Military
 Operation Mercury, codename for the German invasion of Crete during World War II
 Boeing E-6 Mercury, an American aircraft used as an airborne command post and communications relay
 Miles Mercury, a British aircraft designed during the Second World War
 , various vessels or shore establishments of that name
 , seven vessels of that name
 , an 1820 warship
 Mercury (pigeon), honored for bravery during World War II

People
 Mercury (name), including a list of people with that surname or given name

Places
 Mercury, Savoie, a commune in southeastern France
 Mercury Bay, New Zealand
 Mercury, a place in Alabama
 Mercury, Nevada, a closed city within the Nevada Test Site, United States
 Mercury, Texas, United States

Plants 
 Mercury (plant), members of the plant genus Mercurialis
 Annual mercury (Mercurialis annua), a species of flowering plant
 English mercury, or mercury goosefoot (Blitum bonus-henricus), a species of goosefoot

Radio 
 Mercury FM, a radio station in Surrey, United Kingdom
 Mercury 96.6 or Heart Hertfordshire, a radio station in Hertfordshire, United Kingdom

Sports
 Edmonton Mercurys, a 1940s and 1950s intermediate ice hockey team from Canada
 Fujita Soccer Club Mercury, a Japanese women's football team active from 1989 to 1999
 Memphis Mercury, American women's soccer team
 Phoenix Mercury, a Women's National Basketball Association team from Arizona, United States
 Toledo Mercurys, a defunct International Hockey League franchise from Ohio, United States

Vehicles

Air
 Blackburn Mercury, a British aircraft from 1911
 Bristol Mercury, a nine-cylinder aircraft engine

Land
 Mercury (automobile), brand of automobiles produced by the Ford Motor Company from 1938 to 2011
 Mercury (cyclecar), an American cyclecar from 1914
 Mercury (train), a family of New York Central streamliner passenger trains (1936–1958)

Sea
 , several ships of that name 
 Cape Cod Mercury 15, an American sailboat design
 Mercury 18, an American sailboat design

Space
 Project Mercury, a United States human spaceflight program, 1958–1963
 The space capsule used for the flights, also called Mercury
 Mercury (satellite), a series of American spy satellites

Other uses
 Archer Maclean's Mercury, a 2005 PlayStation Portable video game
 Mercury (cipher machine), a 1950s British cipher machine
 Mercury Boulevard in Virginia, United States
 Mercury Cinema, a theatre in Adelaide, Australia
 Shuttle America's callsign
 The Mercury Mall, a shopping centre in Romford, England

See also

 
 The American Mercury, an American magazine published from 1924 to 1981
 Mercuri, a surname and list of people with the surname
 Mercury 1 (disambiguation)
 Mercury 2 (disambiguation)
 Mercury 3 (disambiguation)
 Mercury 4 (disambiguation)
 Mercury 5 (disambiguation)
 Mercury 6 (disambiguation)
 Mercury 7 (disambiguation)
 Mercury 8 (disambiguation)
 Mercury City (disambiguation)
 Mercury FM (disambiguation)
 Mercury House (disambiguation)
 Mercury mission (disambiguation)
 Mercury program (disambiguation)
 Mercury project (disambiguation)